Mense (lit. "People") is an Afrikaans edition of People magazine published by Caxton Magazines in South Africa. The magazine was first published on 29 May 2006.

References

External links
Official website

2006 establishments in South Africa
Afrikaans-language magazines
Celebrity magazines
Magazines established in 2006
Magazines published in South Africa